René Lefeuvre (20 August 1902, Livré-sur-Changeon, Ille-et-Vilaine – 3 July 1988, Paris) was a French Luxemburgist.

As an anti-Stalinist Marxist influenced by Rosa Luxemburg, he joined the Democratic Communist Circle (Cercle Communiste Démocratique) led by Boris Souvarine. He later joined the "Revolutionary Left" tendency within the Section française de l'Internationale ouvrière. In 1938, the tendency was expelled and created the Workers and Peasants' Socialist Party.

He founded the Éditions Spartacus, and was an editor from 1936 until his death in 1988. He published works by Rosa Luxemburg, Victor Serge, Karl Marx, Anton Pannekoek, Daniel Guérin, Alain Guillerm, Paul Mattick, and others.

External links 
René Lefeuvre: pour le socialisme et la liberté, a 2008 documentary about Lefeuvre directed by Julien Chuzeville. Retrieved November 3, 2009 from Atheles.org.

1902 births
1988 deaths
French Section of the Workers' International politicians
Luxemburgists
People from Ille-et-Vilaine
Workers and Peasants' Socialist Party politicians